"Young Lust" is a song by English rock band Pink Floyd, released in 1979. It is the ninth track on the band's eleventh studio album The Wall (1979). The lyrics to the song are about the band throwing themselves into the headlong of hedonism, sex, drugs, and rock and roll.

Composition
"Young Lust" is a blues-inflected hard rock number in E minor, approximately three minutes, 25 seconds in length. Lead vocals are sung by David Gilmour, with background vocals from Roger Waters during the chorus. The lyrics are about a "rock-and-roll refugee" seeking casual sex to relieve the tedium of touring. It's one of few Pink Floyd songs in which Gilmour plays bass guitar and one of three songs Gilmour co-wrote for The Wall.  On the album, the preceding song, "Empty Spaces," ends with an abrupt transition into "Young Lust."

An extended 7" single version was released in Italy, South Africa and Rhodesia. It was 3:58 in length and included a 12-bar instrumental intro with a simple 16-beat drum rhythm that leads into an 8-bar guitar intro. The final 32-bar outro is unobscured by the phone call that is on the album version.

Plot
The Wall tells the story of Pink, an embittered and alienated rock star. At this point in the album's narrative, Pink has achieved wealth and fame, and is usually away from home, due to the demands of his career as a touring performer. He is having casual sex with groupies to relieve the tedium of the road, and is living a separate life from his wife.

The end of the song is a segment of dialogue between Pink and a telephone operator, as Pink twice attempts to place a transatlantic collect call to his wife. A man answers, and when the operator asks if he will accept the charges, the man simply hangs up. This is how Pink learns that his wife is cheating on him. ("See, he keeps hanging up," says the operator. "And it's a man answering!") With this betrayal, his mental breakdown accelerates.

The dialogue with the operator was the result of an arrangement co-producer James Guthrie made with a neighbour in London, Chris Fitzmorris, while the album was being recorded in Los Angeles. He wanted realism, for the operator to actually believe they had caught his wife having an affair, and so didn't inform her she was being recorded. The operator heard in the recording is the second operator they tried the routine with, after the first operator's reaction was deemed unsatisfactory.

Film version
In the film, the scene with the attempted phone call, in which Pink learns his wife is cheating on him, occurs at the very beginning of the song "What Shall We Do Now", which is the extended version of "Empty Spaces", before the "Young Lust" song rather than at the end of the "Young Lust" song. The implications of the song are therefore slightly different. On the album, he is already unfaithful to his wife while on tour, making him a hypocrite when he is appalled at her own unfaithfulness. In the film, he is only seen with a groupie after he learns of his wife's affair, which shows the character in a more sympathetic light.

In the film, several groupies (including a young Joanne Whalley, in her film debut) seduce security guards and roadies to get backstage passes, where one of them (Jenny Wright) ends up going with Pink (Bob Geldof) to his room.

Personnel

Pink Floyd 
David Gilmour – guitar, bass, lead vocals
Nick Mason – drums, tambourine
Roger Waters – backing vocals, bass (live performances) 
Richard Wright – Hammond organ, electric piano

Extra musicians 
Chris Fitzmorris – male telephone voice

Personnel per Vernon Fitch and Richard Mahon.

Original phone call made by USA-FM (circa 1970s)

Cover versions
 During Roger Waters' The Wall concert in Berlin on 21 July 1990, the song was performed by Canadian rock star Bryan Adams. This version reached #7 on the Mainstream Rock Tracks chart and is still popular. It has been added to YouTube from Adams' official channel.
 Producer John Law covered the song with banjo and electronics.
 Luther Wright and the Wrongs covered the song as a reimagined loud, raucous rocker on Rebuild the Wall.
 The song was parodied on Bob Rivers’ Twisted Tunes collection as “I Want to Be a Woman”, dealing with the theme of gender transition.

Further reading
Fitch, Vernon. The Pink Floyd Encyclopedia (3rd edition), 2005. .

References

External links

Pink Floyd songs
Bryan Adams songs
1979 songs
British hard rock songs
Songs written by David Gilmour
Songs written by Roger Waters
Song recordings produced by Bob Ezrin
Live singles
Columbia Records singles
Harvest Records singles
Songs about telephone calls